The Wedding March is a 1929 French silent comedy film directed by André Hugon and starring Pierre Blanchar, Louise Lagrange and Paul Guidé.

It was made by the French subsidiary of Paramount Pictures. The film's sets were designed by the art director Christian-Jaque.

Cast
 Pierre Blanchar 
 Louise Lagrange 
 Paul Guidé 
 Olga Day 
 Janine Borelli 
 Louise Dauville 
 Emilio Vardannes

See also
 The Wedding March (1915)
 The Wedding March (1934)

References
Notes

Bibliography
 Rège, Philippe. Encyclopedia of French Film Directors, Volume 1. Scarecrow Press, 2009.

External links

1929 films
Films directed by André Hugon
French silent feature films
1929 comedy films
French films based on plays
French black-and-white films
French comedy films
Silent comedy films
1920s French films